Boyish is an indie rock duo that got its start in Boston before relocating to New York City in 2019. The group currently consists of lead vocalist India Shore, vocalist and guitar player Claire Altendahl.

The band was formed by Shore and Altendahl for an audition at Berklee College of Music under the moniker The Blue before changing their name to Boyish. They have released two studio albums to date: Carnation and Garden Spider. The former was nominated for an Independent Music Awards, featured in the New Yorker, and now streamed over 1 million times. The single 'FUCK YOU HEATHER' from Garden Spider premiered on Atwood Magazine and was played over 3,500,000 times on Spotify. In February 2021, Boyish released "Superstar" the first track off their upcoming EP. It received positive write-ups from Lyrical Lemonade, Highclouds, and Atwood Magazine. Additionally, the song currently has over 1,600,000 streams and was added to several editorial playlists such as Lorem, All New Indie, Indie Pop & Chill, and Fresh Finds.

Discography

Studio albums

References

External links 

 Official Website

Musical groups from Brooklyn
Musical groups established in 2016
Indie pop groups from New York (state)
Berklee College of Music alumni
2016 establishments in Massachusetts